Caichinque is a volcanic complex lying between Salar de Talar and Salar de Capur, in the high Andean plateau of the Antofagasta Region, in Chile. It is located southwest of the Salar de Atacama, directly S of Cerro Miñiques and SE of Cordón Puntas Negras forming part of the main branch of the Andean volcanic chain in this area.
Route CH-23 is an approach road to the volcano area and could be impacted by eruptions.

The volcano has erupted rocks with composition ranging from basalt to dacite. It grew atop a rhyodacitic ignimbrite.

See also
List of volcanoes in Chile
Cerro Miscanti
Cerros de Incahuasi

References 

 
 (Spanish)

Volcanoes of Antofagasta Region
Mountains of Chile
Stratovolcanoes of Chile